Jessieville is an unincorporated community located in Garland County, Arkansas, United States. It is located next to Hot Springs Village and north of Hot Springs. Highway 7 runs through the community, and Highway 298 is also inside the town. The town has one school campus, which contains an elementary school, a middle school and a high school.

Demographics 
Jessieville's population as of 2014 was 2,467, increasing from 1,412 in 1990 and 1989 in 2010. Median age in the Jessieville zip code (71949) is 29 years (U.S. Median is 37.2). 

The population is 51.2% male and 48.8% female. There are 865 households with an average size of 2.85 people. Of those, 62.58% are categorized as Married Households, 8.04% Divorced with the remaining 29.38% Single. The community identifies as 99.43% white and .57% Native American, with no other ethnicities represented.

Geography 
The land area of the Jessieville community is 207.935 sq. miles with a water area of 27.79 sq. miles.

Education 
Public education for elementary and secondary school students is provided by the following:

 Jessieville School District, which leads to graduation from Jessieville High School.

References

Unincorporated communities in Garland County, Arkansas
Unincorporated communities in Arkansas